Pixley is a census-designated place (CDP) in Tulare County, California, United States.  The population was 3,310 at the 2010 census, up from 2,586 at the 2000 census.

Geography
Pixley is located at  (35.970405, -119.290729).

Climate
According to the Köppen Climate Classification system, Pixley has a semi-arid climate, abbreviated "BSk" on climate maps.

History
The town began as a real-estate-speculation in 1884. The investors Darwin C. Allen, and William B. Bradbury knew their project would succeed only if the town was connected to the mainline of the Southern Pacific. They contacted Frank Pixley; a man whom they knew was a friend of Leland Stanford. In 1886, Pixley joined with the original investors as a partner in the Pixley Townsite Company. The company purchased additional land in the vicinity. When The Southern Pacific extended its tracks to the Townsite, the town prospered. The terms of sale for the land was 25% down, the rest to be carried back for three years by the owners at 8 percent interest. The partners made a handsome profit.
Special railroad fares were offered to people in other areas of California and as far away as Boston in order to bring potential customers to see the new lands and the investment possibilities near Pixley.  
The first house built in Pixley was for Emma, William Pixley's widow, the late brother of Frank Pixley. Her three sons and daughter lived in the home. Emma bought a quarter section of an adjoining piece of land where she farmed until they moved back to San Francisco.
Frank Pixley advertised the town named after him in his biweekly journal The Argonaut.

In the early 1890s, Chris Evans and John Sontag robbed a Southern Pacific Railroad train at Pixley.

In 1933, Pixley was one of the towns in California involved in the San Joaquin cotton strike, a labor action by agricultural workers seeking higher wages. A violent clash between strikers and growers left two workers dead and eight wounded. Five thousand workers gathered in Tulare for the dead strikers' funerals, one of the largest agricultural demonstrations in California's history. Eight cotton growers were indicted in the violence against the workers, but were later acquitted. The strike features in Steinbeck's novel, The Grapes of Wrath, coinciding with the arrival of the Joad family from Oklahoma.

Demographics

2010
The 2010 United States Census reported that Pixley had a population of 3,310. The racial makeup of Pixley was 1,473 (44.5%) White, 90 (2.7%) African American, 28 (0.8%) Native American, 16 (0.5%) Asian, 0 (0.0%) Pacific Islander, 1,587 (47.9%) from other races, and 116 (3.5%) from two or more races. Hispanic or Latino of any race were 2,675 persons (80.8%).

The Census reported that 3,310 people (100% of the population) lived in households, 0 (0%) lived in non-institutionalized group quarters, and 0 (0%) were institutionalized.

There were 798 households, out of which 498 (62.4%) had children under the age of 18 living in them, 482 (60.4%) were opposite-sex married couples living together, 116 (14.5%) had a female householder with no husband present, 91 (11.4%) had a male householder with no wife present.  There were 85 (10.7%) unmarried opposite-sex partnerships, and 5 (0.6%) same-sex married couples or partnerships. 81 households (10.2%) were made up of individuals, and 38 (4.8%) had someone living alone who was 65 years of age or older. The average household size was 4.15.  There were 689 families (86.3% of all households); the average family size was 4.34.

The population was spread out, with 1,267 people (38.3%) under the age of 18, 404 people (12.2%) aged 18 to 24, 869 people (26.3%) aged 25 to 44, 562 people (17.0%) aged 45 to 64, and 208 people (6.3%) who were 65 years of age or older.  The median age was 24.7 years. For every 100 females, there were 107.3 males.  For every 100 females age 18 and over, there were 105.9 males.

The homeowner vacancy rate was 1.6%; the rental vacancy rate was 9.2%.  1,691 people (51.1% of the population) lived in owner-occupied housing units and 1,619 people (48.9%) lived in rental housing units.

2000
As of the census of 2000, there were 2,586 people, 651 households, and 557 families residing in the CDP. The racial makeup of the CDP was 32.87% White, 4.22% African American, 1.74% Native American, 0.19% Asian, 0.08% Pacific Islander, 56.34% from other races, and 4.56% from two or more races. Hispanic or Latino of any race were 68.17% of the population.

There were 651 households, out of which 54.1% had children under the age of 18 living with them, 57.8% were married couples living together, 18.0% had a female householder with no husband present, and 14.3% were non-families. 11.1% of all households were made up of individuals, and 5.7% had someone living alone who was 65 years of age or older.  The average household size was 3.96 and the average family size was 4.21.

In the CDP, the population was spread out, with 39.9% under the age of 18, 12.8% from 18 to 24, 25.3% from 25 to 44, 14.7% from 45 to 64, and 7.3% who were 65 years of age or older.  The median age was 24 years. For every 100 females, there were 113.5 males.  For every 100 females age 18 and over, there were 108.7 males.

The median income for a household in the CDP was $23,304, and the median income for a family was $23,750. Males had a median income of $25,855 versus $20,000 for females. The per capita income for the CDP was $8,674.  About 42.7% of families and 43.2% of the population were below the poverty line, including 53.0% of those under age 18 and 32.0% of those age 65 or over.

Politics
In the state legislature Pixley is located in the 16th Senate District, represented by Democrat Dean Florez, and in the 30th Assembly District, represented by Republican Danny Gilmore.

In the United States House of Representatives, Pixley is in

Notable residents

Roy W. Harmon, winner of the Congressional Medal of Honor.
Roy Buchanan, guitarist.
Neil Hamburger, America's Funnyman, alter-ego of Gregg Turkington.

References

Census-designated places in Tulare County, California
Census-designated places in California
Populated places established in 1884
1884 establishments in California